Karamino is a rural locality (a village) in Porozhskoye Rural Settlement of Onezhsky District, Arkhangelsk Oblast, Russia. The population was 1 as of 2010.

Geography 
Karamino is located between Bolshaya and Malaya Onega, 57 km southeast of Onega (the district's administrative centre) by road.

References 

Rural localities in Onezhsky District